All the World's a Stage is a double live album by Canadian rock band Rush, released in 1976. The album was recorded at Massey Hall in Toronto on June 11, 12, and 13, 1976, during the band's breakthrough 2112 tour. The title of the album alludes to William Shakespeare's play As You Like It, which would again be referenced by Rush in the 1981 song "Limelight".

Content
According to lead vocalist and bassist Geddy Lee, the release of a live album in late 1976 "was definitely something we used to buy us more time" as Rush worked on the studio followup to their commercial breakthrough album 2112, released earlier that same year.

This album captures the entire setlist that was regularly performed during headlining shows of the 2112 tour. However, due to technological limits of approximately 20 minutes per side on vinyl, the positions of "Lakeside Park" and "2112" were swapped with "Fly By Night / In The Mood" and "Something For Nothing".

Due to stage time restraints during the 2112 tour of 1976, this performance of the song "2112" omits the "Discovery" and "Oracle: The Dream" sections of the studio recording. Although the final 32 seconds of "Discovery" are played as a lead-in to "Presentation", the liner notes and track listing do not indicate this. While the entirety of "Discovery" would be performed during the A Farewell To Kings tour of 1977-78 and Hemispheres tour of 1978–79, Rush would not perform the entire suite live until the Test for Echo tour of 1996–97, as documented on the live album Different Stages.

Alternate recordings of "2112" and "Something For Nothing" from the June 11–13 performances were released as part of the 2112: 40th Anniversary box set in 2016.

According to the liner notes, All the World's a Stage marks the end of the "first chapter of Rush" and would begin a trend of Rush releasing a live album after every four studio albums. This lasted until 2003, when the band released a live album and DVD of each subsequent studio album's tour.

Fellow Toronto band Max Webster was the opening act for all 3 Massey Hall performances recorded for the album.

Reception
All the World's a Stage was Rush's first US Top 40-charting album and went gold, alongside A Farewell to Kings and 2112 on November 16, 1977. It was certified platinum in the United States in 1981 after the release of Moving Pictures. In Canada, Gold certification came on December 1, 1976, and platinum on August 1, 1978.

Reissues
A remaster was issued in 1997.
 The tray has a picture of the star with man painting (mirroring the cover art of Retrospective I) with "The Rush Remasters" printed in all capital letters just to the left. All remasters from Rush through Permanent Waves are like this.
 The original CD omitted "What You're Doing" and the post-show chatter due to recording length constraints (CDs could hold only 75 minutes at the time). By 1997, however, advances in recording technology had increased that maximum time to 80 minutes; the missing song and chatter are included in the remaster. Prior to its release, the same live version of "What You're Doing" was included on the compilation Chronicles in 1990.
 The album's original triple gatefold artwork with concert pictures is included with the remaster.

All the World's a Stage was remastered again in 2011 by Andy VanDette for the "Sector" box sets, which re-released all of Rush's Mercury-era albums.  All the World's a Stage is included in the Sector 1 set.

All the World's a Stage was remastered for vinyl in 2015 by Sean Magee at Abbey Road Studios as a part of the official "12 Months of Rush" promotion. The high definition master prepared for this release was also made available for purchase in 24-bit/96 kHz and 24-bit/192 kHz formats, at several high-resolution audio online music stores. These masters have significantly less dynamic range compression  than the 1997 remasters and the "Sector" remasters by Andy VanDette.

Track listing

Track 1 includes a Peart drum solo

Personnel
Geddy Lee – lead vocals, bass guitar
Alex Lifeson – guitar, vocals
Neil Peart – drums, percussion
Terry Brown – engineer
Hugh Syme – design
George Graves – mastering on original album
Bob Ludwig – remastering

Charts

Certifications

References

External links
 

1976 live albums
Anthem Records live albums
Rush (band) live albums
Mercury Records live albums
Albums recorded at Massey Hall